Walter Gowans Cowan (1874 – 1960) was a Scottish professional footballer who played as an inside forward or wing half for Motherwell and Sunderland.

References

1874 births
1960 deaths
Footballers from Motherwell
Scottish footballers
Association football inside forwards
Association football wing halves
Motherwell F.C. players
Sunderland A.F.C. players
English Football League players
Scottish Football League players
Date of birth missing
Date of death missing